Zabrus maroccanus is a species of ground beetle in the Pelor subgenus that is endemic to Morocco, where it can be found in such provinces as Tangier, Rharb, Si Allel, Schou, and Tazi.

References

Beetles described in 1864
Beetles of North Africa
Endemic fauna of Morocco
Zabrus